Bjarne Jeppesen (born 19 August 1954) is a former Danish handball player who competed in the 1980 Summer Olympics.

He was born in Glostrup.

In 1980 he finished ninth with the Danish team in the Olympic tournament. He played five matches and scored 24 goals.

External links
 profile

1954 births
Living people
Danish male handball players
Olympic handball players of Denmark
Handball players at the 1980 Summer Olympics
People from Glostrup Municipality
Sportspeople from the Capital Region of Denmark